Botanical gardens in Philippines have collections consisting entirely of Philippines native and endemic species; most have a collection that include plants from around the world. There are botanical gardens and arboreta in many provinces, municipalities, and cities of Philippines, some administered by local governments and some are privately owned.

References 

Philippines
Botanical gardens